R. J. Davis (born October 21, 2001) is an American college basketball player for the North Carolina Tar Heels of the Atlantic Coast Conference (ACC).

High school career
Davis attended Archbishop Stepinac High School in White Plains, New York. He led the Crusaders to a 27–5 record and the CHSAA city championship as well as the New York State Federation championship during his sophomore season. However, he suffered an injury as a sophomore which kept him from playing in the summer circuit. As a junior, Davis averaged 25.4 points, seven rebounds, four assists and 1.7 steals per game. Davis was named The Journal News Westchester/Putnam Player of the Year and helped the team reach the city championship game. He averaged 26.5 points, eight rebounds, 5.3 assists and 2.1 steals per game as a senior. Davis was named a McDonald's All-American as well as Mr. New York Basketball.

Recruiting
Considered a four-star recruit, Davis was ranked 197th by 247Sports in early 2019, but rose in most recruiting services' and was ranked No. 43 in the Class of 2020 according to ESPN. Davis committed to playing college basketball for North Carolina in October 2019, choosing the Tar Heels over Georgetown, Marquette and Pittsburgh.

College career

Freshman
As a freshman, Davis averaged 8.4 points, 2.3 rebounds, and 1.9 assists per game while shooting 35.0 percent from the floor. He was named to the All-Atlantic Coast Conference Academic Team.

Sophomore
A starter all season, Davis was a member of the "Iron Five" starting lineup that led North Carolina on an improbable run to the 2022 Final Four alongside Armando Bacot, Brady Manek, Caleb Love, and Leaky Black. On November 13, 2021, he scored a then-career-high 26 points in a 94–87 win against Brown. Davis broke his career high in the second round of the NCAA Tournament, scoring 30 points in the Tar Heels' 93–86 upset victory against Baylor. He became the first Tar Heel to score 30 points and post 5 rebounds and 5 assists in an NCAA tournament game.

Junior
After the Tar Heels' run to the national championship game in the season prior, Davis, Black, Bacot, and Love all decided to return to Chapel Hill. Despite the team's preseason No.1 ranking, the Tar Heels struggled all season, missing the NCAA tournament and going 23–10 overall. Davis started all but one game in the 2022-23 season, his lone appearance off the bench coming on UNC's Senior Day, where it is tradition for all seniors being honored to start the game. He improved off of many of his statistics from the previous season, averaging 16.1 points, 5.1 rebounds, and 3.2 assists per game.

Career statistics

College

|-
| style="text-align:left;"| 2020–21
| style="text-align:left;"| North Carolina
| 29 || 10 || 22.3 || .350 || .323 || .821 || 2.3 || 1.9 || .7 || .1 || 8.4
|-
| style="text-align:left;"| 2021–22
| style="text-align:left;"| North Carolina
| 39 || 39 || 33.9 || .425 || .367 || .833 || 4.3 || 3.6 || 1.0 || .2 || 13.5
|-
| style="text-align:left;"| 2022–23
| style="text-align:left;"| North Carolina
| 33 || 32 || 35.0 || .438 || .362 || .881 || 5.1 || 3.2 || 1.1 || .1 || 16.1
|- class="sortbottom"
| style="text-align:center;" colspan="2"| Career
|| 101 || 81 || 31.0 || .414 || .355 || .850 || 4.0 || 3.0 || .9 || .1 || 12.9

References

External links
North Carolina Tar Heels bio

2001 births
Living people
American men's basketball players
Archbishop Stepinac High School alumni
Basketball players from New York (state)
McDonald's High School All-Americans
North Carolina Tar Heels men's basketball players
People from White Plains, New York
Point guards